Little Sampford is a village and a civil parish on the B1053 road, in the Uttlesford district, in the county of Essex, England. The population of the civil parish at the 2011 Census was 251. Until the 18th century the ecclesiastical parish was known as St Mary the Virgin, Sampford Parva.

See also
Great Sampford
The Hundred Parishes

References

External links 
 Vision of Britain

Villages in Essex
Uttlesford
Civil parishes in Essex